Hans Fischer (January 6, 1909 – April 19, 1958) was a Swiss painter. He was well known as the author and illustrator of the children's book Pitschi. His nickname was Fis.

Life and works
Hans Fischer first attended the Ecole des Beaux-Arts industriels in Geneva, then studied in Zürich. He worked as artist, graphic designer and cartoonist. He also painted sets for the Cabaret Cornichon. In 1945 an exhibition of his work took place at the Berner Kunsthalle. In 1955 he was awarded a prize at the São Paulo Art Biennial.

A retrospective of his work was held on his centenary in February 2009 at Galerie Pendo in Zurich.

Gallery

References

1909 births
1958 deaths
20th-century Swiss painters
Swiss male painters
20th-century Swiss male artists